Truckton is an unincorporated prairie hamlet in El Paso County, Colorado, south of State Highway 94, at and about the intersection of Truckton Road and Boone Road. There is a church at Truckton, also a communications tower, but no other businesses or services; and several scattered homes.

References 

Towns in El Paso County, Colorado
Towns in Colorado